Closed for Storm is a 2020 documentary film by YouTube creator Jake Williams of Bright Sun Films. It focuses on Six Flags New Orleans, a Louisiana amusement park that has been abandoned since it was flooded during Hurricane Katrina in 2005.

The film was officially announced on January 17, 2020 in a video posted by Williams called "My Documentary Announcement." In July 2020, Williams showed new clips of Closed for Storm on a podcast called Factual America Podcast. The documentary premiered at the New Orleans Film Festival on November 7, 2020. Jake Williams has stated in a YouTube video that the film will be publicly released in July 2021.
The title of the film "Closed for Storm" was based on the last message ever written on the main entrance sign to Six Flags New Orleans, in preparation for Hurricane Katrina in late August 2005.

References

External links
 
 

2020 films
2020 documentary films
American documentary films
Six Flags New Orleans
2020s English-language films
2020s American films